Passage to Nirvana, A Survivor's Zen Voyage: Reflections on Loss, Discovery, Healing & Hope is a memoir by Lee Carlson, written over a several-year period from 2005 to 2010, primarily on board a 60-foot sailboat named Nirvana that he shared with his fiancée Meg.  It was his first book, although he had made his living as a writer for most of his adult life, working first as a journalist, magazine editor and freelance writer, and then moving into advertising and marketing copywriting. The book centers around Carlson's traumatic brain injury and subsequent recovery, as well as his mother's death from a traumatic brain injury. However the book is much more far-ranging, delving into such subjects as Zen Buddhism, sailing, divorce, children, family and even poetry. Ultimately it is a book about finding peace and happiness after a traumatic life event, a book about finding the joy in living.

Plot summary

Passage to Nirvana begins with Carlson's accident, when he was hit by a car standing outside a car wash, striking his head violently on the pavement, fracturing his skull, lapsing into a light coma and sustaining a traumatic brain injury, with bleeding on the brain and other damage. The story follows him through his brief hospitalization, then a year-long rehab in Florida, then his return to the North Fork of Long Island where he tries to rebuild his shattered life. His wife has left him and moved away with their children, his business has evaporated, he has no home and has to begin with noting to renew his life. During his year in Florida he also helps care for his mother, who is severely disabled from her own traumatic brain injury sustained when she fell down a flight of basement stairs. She is in a wheelchair, unable to walk, talk or feed herself. While he is in Florida, his mother eventually dies. Upon returning to Long Island, more misfortunes seem to continue: his aunt dies of cancer, as does his brother-in-law, and he returns to Buffalo to help his sister and her children while his brother-in-law is in the hospital.

While this may sound morbid and depressing, the bulk of the book is uplifting, a positive affirmation of life. Carlson concentrates on his Zen Buddhist studies and meditation as a way of helping him heal, working with the noted writer and Zen teacher Peter Matthiessen. Sections of the book take place in the Ocean Zendo, a Zen center run by Matthiessen, and much of the book is a meditation on the spiritual aspects of healing, acceptance and rebuilding a life. Eventually Carlson meets a beautiful, understanding woman who has been through difficulties of her own: a difficult divorce, raising two children as a single mother. They fall in love, and decide to buy a sailboat named "Nirvana" that they discover rotting in a boatyard in St. Martin. They renovate the boat, sail her back to the eastern end of Long Island, where they are joined by their four children and two dogs, working at creating a new family and a new life. Eventually they sail "Nirvana" to the Bahamas for a winter writing sabbatical, where most of the book was written.

Trying to describe the "plot" is difficult, however, as the book is really a collection of short essays, some about events happening in real time, some about traumatic brain injury, some reflections on various aspects of philosophy and Eastern thought, and some stories recalling the author's childhood. See the section "Unique Writing Style" below for more information.

Unique writing style

The book is written as a series of short, interconnected essays, many of them short, short stories no more than a few pages long, using some example from Carlson's life and recovery as a kind of moral fable. Most of the chapters are preceded by exceedingly short poems, often consisting of only three or four words, that Carlson calls a "Po." The narrative of the book is not linear, and in the book's introduction Carlson says that much of the book's unique style came from how his brain functioned during his recovery. The Po because initially he could not remember long sentences; the short chapters because he could not remember longer chapters, and the non-linear narrative because that's how his mind was functioning, having trouble concentrating on any one thing for long periods of time. As such the narrative jumps back and forth, loops around in time, and is refreshingly inventive and interesting. At the same time, each short chapter is designed as a stand-alone essay, so the reader can pick up the book, turn to any chapter and read it as a kind of short story.

Background and publication
Written during 2005-2010, and published in 2010, Passage to Nirvana was rejected by a number of mainstream publishers and agents, due to its unusual writing style and layout. Because of his background in magazine publishing, Carlson decided to form his own publishing company, Henry Chapin and Sons, to publish and market the book. Given his interest in new technology, the internet, and the rapidly changing publishing business, he also decided to use the new crowdfunding paradigm for raising money to publish the book, and raised nearly $13,000 from small, individual donors using the arts funding web site kickstarter. He then used Facebook, as well as the worldwide network of Amazon.com sites such as Amazon Japan as a way of marketing the book and reaching out to a worldwide readership, where the book found a following, gathering fans from not only the U.S., but from Canada, Mexico, Peru, Brazil, Argentina, Chile, the U.K., Ireland, France, Italy, Russia, Poland, Morocco, South Africa, Croatia, India, Nepal, Indonesia, Japan, Australia and other countries.

Reviews and criticism
Passage to Nirvana has received positive reviews. One reviewer said, "Mr. Carlson is playful with words, which is part of the enchantment of his po-etics, or short poems, called po. With titles like “Passage to Nirvana” and “The Book of Po,” they made me think of “Passage to India” and “Life of Pi.” The references lead by imagination to the land of origin for Buddhism, or so I take it. Mr. Carlson’s journey is graced with whimsy, like a good south wind with the sail in a reach and spray in your face....The writing here is lucid, with a light touch — light of heart."

Another reviewer said "No one is perfect, and realizing this is the first step in finding that second opportunity in life. "Passage to Nirvana: A Survivor's Zen Voyage: Reflections on Loss, Discovery, Healing & Hope" is an inspirational and spiritual read from Lee Carlson. Recovering from a traumatic brain injury, he found new joy in life and found his own passage to joy in life through many arts of Zen. Thoughtful and riveting reading, "Passage to Nirvana" is an enlightening and educational read that shouldn't be overlooked for those looking for their own second chances."

A third review called Passage to Nirvana "An inspirational story of how love and the strength of the human spirit can triumph over adversity, Passage to Nirvana is a reminder to cherish every day and never forget that our health is, indeed, our wealth."

While the book is ostensibly about recovering from traumatic brain injury, the spiritual nature of the book is one thing that seems to have captured many people's attention. There is the review in the East Hampton Star that was written by a minister (see first review above), and on the book's website there are many reviews and testimonials from people with two testimonials from religious teachers standing out: “Amazing, Really Amazing. I Want to Share it With Others.” -Rabbi John Linder, Temple Solei; and “Deserves to be Hailed As A Unique and Lasting Contribution to American Letters.” -Reverend Thomas Yorty, Westminster Presbyterian Church. The book has received all five-star reviews on Amazon.com.

References

External links 
Official Website For Passage to Nirvana
Facebook Fan Page for Passage to Nirvana

Interviews
NPR Interview: Buffalo born author finds nirvana healing from a TBI
Buffalo Style Interview

2010 non-fiction books
Literary autobiographies
Books about Zen
Kickstarter-funded publications
2010 in religion